Birchwood Mansions is a block of flats in Fortis Green Road, Muswell Hill, London, and a grade II listed building with Historic England. The building was constructed in 1907 to a design by W.J. and William Collins in the Arts and Crafts style.

Gallery

See also
The Gables

References

External links

Grade II listed buildings in the London Borough of Haringey
Muswell Hill
Arts and Crafts architecture in London
Residential buildings in London
Grade II listed residential buildings